The following list of Carnegie libraries in Massachusetts provides information on Carnegie public libraries in Massachusetts, where 43 of them were built  from 1901 to 1917, funded by 35 grants totaling $1,137,500 and awarded by the Carnegie Corporation of New York. Massachusetts Carnegie libraries were also built at five academic institutions at a cost of $513,846.

Key

Public libraries

Academic libraries

See also
List of public libraries in Massachusetts

Notes

References

Note: The above references, while all authoritative, are not entirely mutually consistent. Some details of this list may have been drawn from one of the references without support from the others.  Reader discretion is advised.

Massachusetts
Libraries
 
Libraries